Samuel Guevara (born July 28, 1993) is an American professional wrestler signed to All Elite Wrestling (AEW), where he is a member of the Jericho Appreciation Society. He is a record tying three-time former AEW TNT Champion.  He also appears in AEW's Mexico based partner promotion Lucha Libre AAA Worldwide (AAA), where is a former AAA Mixed Tag Team Champion with real life wife Tay Melo, and a former AAA Crusierweight Champion.

Guevara made his professional wrestling debut in 2010 - after being trained by Booker T - beginning his career in Booker's Reality of Wrestling promotion. Throughout the 2010s, he worked for numerous U.S. companies, most notably Impact Wrestling. He has also wrestled in Japan with DDT Pro Wrestling.

Guevara has been with AEW since the promotion's founding in 2019, featured early on as a member of Chris Jericho's first stable, The Inner Circle.

Early life
Sammy Guevara was born on July 28, 1993 in Houston, Texas to a Cuban father and an American mother. He grew up in the nearby suburb of Katy, Texas, and his parents divorced when Sammy was young. Guevara became a fan of wrestling in 2004 when he went to a WWE Smackdown show in Houston where he saw Booker T and Rey Mysterio wrestle. He later decided he wanted to become a professional wrestler, so he went to Booker T’s Reality of Wrestling wrestling school in Houston in 2010.

Professional wrestling career

Early career (2010–2019) 
After graduating from Booker T's wrestling school, Guevara made his major promotion debut on January 5, 2013 for the National Wrestling Alliance (NWA). On April 7, 2016, Guevara wrestled a AAA tag team dark match with Tony Guevara (The Laredo Kid) against Los Matadores (Primo and Epico Colón). Guevara first worked for Impact Wrestling in 2017 on its weekly TV show, Impact Xplosion, in a tag team match (with Davey Richards) against Drago and Taiji Ishimori. Guevara was later in Impact's Super X Cup tournament, losing to Drago in its opening round. Guevara debuted for Pro Wrestling Guerrilla (PWG) in its 2017 Battle of Los Angeles tournament, advancing to the quarterfinals. At PWG's May 2018 Bask In His Glory event, Guevara wrestled PWG World Champion WALTER in the main event for the title. On December 7, 2017, Guevara debuted in Major League Wrestling (MLW), and appeared many times on its TV show (MLW Fusion) in 2018. Guevara won the PWFP Ultimate Championship from Raja Naveed at the "Rumble in Pakistan" event on April 28, 2019, but was later stripped of the title for going 340+ days without making any title defenses.

Lucha Libre AAA Worldwide (2018–2019) 
Guevara was a cast member for season four of Lucha Underground, the scripted TV show AAA co-produced with the El Rey network. Guevara made his Lucha Libre AAA World Wide debut at Verano de Escándalo 2018. He won the AAA World Cruiserweight Championship at the Triplemanía XXVI annual event on August before losing it to Laredo Kid on February 16, 2019. At Triplemanía XXVII, Guevara teamed up with Scarlett Bordeaux in a match for the AAA World Mixed Tag Team Championship where they were unsuccessful.

All Elite Wrestling (2019–present)

Formation of The Inner Circle (2019–2020) 

On February 7, 2019, Guevara was announced to have signed with the newly formed All Elite Wrestling (AEW). At the promotion's inaugural event, Double or Nothing, on May 25, Guevara was defeated by Kip Sabian. At Fight for the Fallen on July 13, Guevara teamed with MJF and Shawn Spears to defeat Darby Allin, Jimmy Havoc and Joey Janela in a six-man tag team match. On the premiere episode of AEW Dynamite on October 2, Guevara lost to Cody. After the match, Guevara shook hands with Cody, before AEW World Champion Chris Jericho viciously attacked Cody from behind in front of him. Later on that night, Guevara established himself as a heel when he assisted AEW World Champion Chris Jericho, Jake Hager (who made his AEW debut), Santana and Ortiz attacking Cody, The Young Bucks and Cody's half-brother Dustin Rhodes. They created a group that would become known as "The Inner Circle". Guevara would then begin a feud with Darby Allin leading into 2020, all the while assisting Jericho in his rivalries and championship defenses. At Revolution on February 29, 2020, Guevara was defeated by Allin. On the March 25 episode of AEW, The Inner Circle and The Elite were set to compete in a Blood and Guts match, but the COVID-19 outbreak would cause AEW to postpone the match. Guevara would then compete in a tournament to crown the inaugural AEW TNT Champion. He was again beaten by Allin in the first round of the tournament. A match between Matt Hardy and The Elite (Adam Page, Kenny Omega and The Young Bucks) and The Inner Circle would be announced for Double or Nothing, called a Stadium Stampede match. At the event, The Inner Circle faced The Elite and Matt Hardy, but were unsuccessful in winning.

On June 22, 2020, Guevara was suspended by AEW after it was revealed that he made an inappropriate joke about wanting to "go rape" WWE wrestler Sasha Banks during a podcast in January 2016. He later made a YouTube video apologizing for the remarks and taking accountability for what he said. Later that day, Banks announced that she and Guevara were in contact with each other, that he had apologized to her, and that they had engaged in an "open discussion" to help him understand the severity of his comments. The conditions of his suspension are that he was required to attend sensitivity training, while his weekly pay was donated to the Women's Center of Jacksonville during the course of his suspension. Guevara returned on the July 22 episode of Dynamite, disguised as Serpentico, as he interfered to help Jericho and Hager defeat Jungle Boy and Luchasaurus in a tag team match.

Feuds with Matt Hardy and The Pinnacle (2020–2021) 
After Guevara's return, he would resume his feud with Matt Hardy. On the August 5th episode of Dynamite, Guevara would get into a brawl with Hardy, resulting in Guevara hitting Matt Hardy with a chair, busting him open. He followed this with a 630 senton through a table. On the August 22 episode of Dynamite, Guevara would be attacked by Hardy during his cue cards segment.  Matt would then launch Guevara through a table. A match between the two was made for All Out. The match would be a "Broken Rules" match, also known as a last man standing match. At the event, Sammy Guevara would lose to Matt Hardy. Their feud would yet again be put on hiatus, due to Hardy sustaining an injury during the match. On the September 16th episode of Dynamite, Matt Hardy would be found unconscious backstage, and he would later state that someone had attacked him. The attacker was revealed to be Guevara a month later, where he burned photographs of Hardy. And "The Elite Deletion" match was announced, taking place at The Hardy Compound in Cameron, North Carolina. The match was aired on the Full Gear pay-per-view on November 7, with Santana, Ortiz, and Gangrel running to aid Guevara and Private Party and The Hurricane evening the odds for Hardy. After sealing off the interfering parties, Hardy defeated Guevara again, ending the feud. At Full Gear, MJF and Wardlow became Guevara's new teammates in The Inner Circle after MJF defeated Jericho. On the December 9th Dynamite, Chris Jericho held an ultimatum for the Inner Circle, with many members showing frustrations with MJF. Sammy Guevara would declare that if one more thing happened with MJF, then he would quit the Inner Circle. The two would then shake hands.

On the February 10, 2021 edition of AEW Dynamite, following weeks of growing tension between the two, Guevara attacked MJF following a backstage confrontation which gave MJF a kayfabe rib injury. Later on that night, Guevara announced his departure from The Inner Circle. This was set to leave him appearing on Impact Wrestling, but both parties couldn't come to an agreement about Guevara's storylines. A month later on the March 10 episode of Dynamite, Guevara would make a return to AEW. He would reveal that he had set up a camera in The Inner Circle's locker room, which recorded MJF convincing Jake Hager, Santana, and Ortiz to turn on Chris Jericho. When it looked as though the three were about to attack Guevara and Jericho, they instead turned to MJF. Jericho would then fire MJF on the spot. However, MJF would state that he had already begun creating his own group, which led to Shawn Spears, Wardlow, FTR, and Tully Blanchard coming out and attacking The Inner Circle. On the March 31 episode of Dynamite, Guevara, along with all of the other Inner Circle members, would return yet again and attack the group now known as The Pinnacle. They would kick The Pinnacle out of their locker room, as they had taken over it during the Inner Circle's absence.

Two weeks later on April 7, Chris Jericho (along with the rest of the members of the Inner Circle) would challenge The Pinnacle to a Blood and Guts match. At AEW Blood and Guts, The Pinnacle would defeat The Inner Circle, after Guevara forfeited the match to save Chris Jericho from being pushed off the top of the cage by MJF. However, MJF would still push Jericho off the cage onto the ramp. On the next episode of Dynamite, The Inner Circle would interrupt The Pinnacle's celebration by coming out in a "Bubbly Truck" (reminiscent of when Kurt Angle sprayed The Alliance with milk in a truck.) The Inner Circle would do the same thing to The Pinnacle, spraying them with bubbly and ruining their celebration. However, MJF would challenge The Inner Circle to a Stadium Stampede match at Double or Nothing, with the stipulation being that if The Inner Circle lost, they had to disband. Chris Jericho would accept the match, with Guevara primarily wrestling Shawn Spears. At Double or Nothing, The Inner Circle would win after Guevara hit a 630 senton on Spears in the ring after an extensive backstage brawl between the two, keeping the group alive. On the episode following the pay-per-view, The Inner Circle would declare a "summer of violence" for the Pinnacle. On the June 30th edition of AEW Dynamite, Sammy Guevara would lose to MJF after Spears hit him with a chair to the head.

TNT Champion (2021–2022)
On September 29, Guevara won the AEW TNT Championship at Dynamite by defeating Miro. The next week, Guevara would made his first successful defense against a debuting Bobby Fish. On December 25, at the special Holiday Bash episode of Rampage, Guevara lost the title to Cody Rhodes, ending his reign at 87 days. A TNT Championship rematch between Rhodes and Guevara was scheduled to take place at Battle of the Belts I on January 8, 2022. However, Rhodes was forced to withdraw after being exposed to COVID-19. An interim TNT title was created as a result, with a match between Guevara and Cody's brother, Dustin, being scheduled at Battle of the Belts instead. Guevara would go on to win the match and become the interim TNT champion. On January 26 at AEW Beach Break, Guevara defeated Cody Rhodes in a ladder match to unify the belts, becoming the undisputed (and two-time) TNT Champion. The match was awarded 5 stars by professional wrestling journalist Dave Meltzer, giving Guevara his first 5-star match. On the February 9, 2022 episode of AEW Dynamite, the Inner Circle had a team meeting that ended with Sammy Guevara throwing his vest and walking out. At Revolution 2022, Guevara would win a Tornado tag team match with Allin and Sting over Andrade El Idolo, Matt Hardy, and Isiah Kassidy.

On the March 9, 2022 episode Dynamite, Guevara would lose the TNT Championship to Scorpio Sky. Sammy would continue his feud with Scorpio Sky but with the inclusion of his girlfriend Tay Conti due to the official signing  of Paige VanZant in AEW. At Battle of the Belts II, Sammy Guevara successfully ended Scorpio Sky's undefeated streak with a low blow, winning his record-tying 3rd TNT Championship. Sammy dropped the title back to Scorpio Sky on the April 27 episode of Dynamite in a ladder match, thus ending his reign at 12 days, which is the shortest reign in the title's history. Guevara also suffered injuries from the ladder match to his shoulder, as a result of a Twisting Splash from the top of a ladder. At Double or Nothing on May 29, 2022, Sky, VanZant and Ethan Page defeated Guevara, Frankie Kazarian and Tay Conti at in a six-person tag team match, with Guevara and Kazarian losing the right to further challenge Sky for the TNT Championship as a result.

Jericho Appreciation Society (2022-present)
On the June 15, 2022 Dynamite special episode Road Rager, Guevara (dressed as Fuego Del Sol) interfered in the hair vs hair match between Ortiz and Chris Jericho, costing Ortiz the match and reuniting with Jericho and Hager, officially turning heel and joining the Jericho Appreciation Society. On August 12 on AEW Rampage Quake by the Lake Guevara teamed up with his wife Tay Melo to defend their AAA Mixed Tag Team Championship against Dante Martin and Skye Blue which they successfully retained.

Return to AAA (2022-present)
On April 30, 2022 Guevara returned to AAA teaming with Tay Conti to defeat Los Vipers, Maravilla and Látigo, and Sexy Star II and Komander to win the AAA World Mixed Tag Team Championship at Triplemanía XXX. For most of the match, La Parka Negra would wrestle in Guevara’s place.

Personal life
Guevara was in a relationship for 8 years with Pamella Nizio, a medical worker from Houston. In August 2021, he proposed to her at an AEW show in Houston in the middle of the ring; however, they split up soon afterwards in October of that same year.

Since January 2022, Guevara has been in a relationship with fellow AEW professional wrestler Taynara Melo, better known by her ring name Tay Conti. In June 2022, Guevara announced his engagement to Melo. On August 8, 2022 , Guevara and his now wife held their wedding ceremony in Orlando.

Controversies
On June 22, 2020, Guevara was suspended by AEW after it was revealed that he made an inappropriate joke about wanting to "go rape" WWE wrestler Sasha Banks during a podcast in January 2016. He later made a YouTube video apologizing for the remarks and taking accountability for what he said. Later that day, Banks announced that she and Guevara were in contact with each other, that he had apologized to her, and that they had engaged in an "open discussion" to help him understand the severity of his comments. The conditions of his suspension are that he was required to attend sensitivity training, while his weekly pay was donated to the Women's Center of Jacksonville during the course of his suspension.

Other media 

Guevara has his own YouTube channel, which has 200,000 subscribers as of 2022. He regularly uploads vlogs (video blogs) on the channel. Guevara featured in the AEW mobile game, "AEW Elite GM" in 2021. Notable vlogs of Guevara's include his trips to do shows for promotions outside North America, his initial adventures as a wrestler working for independent promotions around the United States, as well as his adventures traveling around the United States with his AEW co-workers. Guevara's friends and fellow AEW co-workers, such as Fuego Del Sol, Griff Garrison, Alan "5" Angels, Isiah Kassidy, Dustin Rhodes, and (more recently) Aaron Solow and wife Tay Melo make frequent appearances, and the vlogs, instead of sticking strictly to a visual diary format, now include specific fictional storylines between the aforementioned wrestling personalities.

Filmography

Television

Championships and accomplishments 

 All Elite Wrestling
 AEW TNT Championship (3 times)
 Interim AEW TNT Championship (1 time)
 Dynamite Award (2 times)
 "Bleacher Report PPV Moment of the Year" (2020) – Stadium Stampede match (The Elite vs. The Inner Circle) – Double or Nothing (May 23)
Breakout Star - Male (2022)
 Adrenaline Pro Wrestling
 APW Gladiator Championship (1 time, current)
 CBS Sports
 Worst Moment of the Year (2020) 
 Inspire Pro Wrestling
 Inspire Pro Junior Crown Championship (2 times)
 Inspire Pro Pure Prestige Championship (1 time)
 Lucha Libre AAA Worldwide
 AAA Mixed Tag Team Championship (1 time) - with Tay Conti/Tay Melo
 AAA World Cruiserweight Championship (1 time)
 Other championships
 Bull of the Woods Championship (1 time)
 Pro Wrestling Federation of Pakistan
 PWFP Ultimate Championship (1 time)
 Pro Wrestling Illustrated
 Faction of the Year (2021) – with The Inner Circle
 Ranked No. 28 of the top 500 singles wrestlers in the PWI 500 in 2022
River City Wrestling
RCW International Championship (2 times)
RCW Phoenix Championship (2 times)
Total Championship Wrestling
 TCW Cruiserweight Championship (1 time)
 WrestleCircus
 WC Ringmaster Championship (1 time)
 WC Ringmaster Championship Tournament (2019)
 WC Sideshow Championship (1 time)
 Wrestling Association of Reynosa City
 WAR City Heavyweight Championship (1 time, current)
 Xtreme Wrestling Alliance
 XWA Heavyweight Championship (1 time)
Other titles
National Don’t H8 Ringmaster (2018)

References

External links 

 
 
 Major League Wrestling profile
 

1993 births
21st-century professional wrestlers
All Elite Wrestling personnel
AEW TNT Champions
American male professional wrestlers
American sportspeople of Cuban descent
Cuban male professional wrestlers
Living people
People from Katy, Texas
Professional wrestlers from Texas
Sportspeople from Harris County, Texas
YouTubers from Texas
Sports YouTubers
YouTube channels launched in 2009
Jericho Appreciation Society members
AAA World Cruiserweight Champions
AAA World Mixed Tag Team Champions
American video bloggers